Alex Flávio Santos Luz (born 21 January 1993), known as Alex Flávio, is a Brazilian professional footballer who plays for Chanthaburi as a defender.

References

External links 
 
 
 Player's profile at pressball.by

1993 births
Living people
Brazilian footballers
Brazilian expatriate footballers
Expatriate footballers in Belarus
Expatriate footballers in Vietnam
Association football defenders
Cruzeiro Esporte Clube players
Mirassol Futebol Clube players
Barretos Esporte Clube players
Associação Desportiva São Caetano players
Clube Atlético Penapolense players
FC Energetik-BGU Minsk players
Associação Portuguesa de Desportos players
Clube Atlético Linense players
Saigon FC players
Sportspeople from Salvador, Bahia